True 2 Myself is the debut studio album by American rapper Lil Tjay. It was released on October 11, 2019 through Columbia Records. The production on the album was handled by multiple producers including CashMoneyAP, TnTXD, JD On Tha Track and Dystinkt Beatz among others. The album also features guest appearances from Rileyy Lanez, Jay Critch, Lil Baby, Lil Durk, and Lil Wayne.

True 2 Myself was supported by seven singles: "Brothers", "Leaked", "Goat", "Ruthless", "Laneswitch", "F.N" and "Hold On". The album received generally positive reviews from music critics and was a commercial success. It debuted at number five on the US Billboard 200 chart earning 45,000 album-equivalent units in its first week. The album was certified double platinum by the Recording Industry Association of America (RIAA) in February 2023.

Background
The artists announced his debut studio album on October 9, 2019 via his social media and revealed the tracklist as well as the cover art of the album. Being asked about the album title, he explained that he wants "to make sure that I put myself first and accomplish what I need to accomplish". To him, the album represents his "next level of success" and as a result, he needs "be true to who I am and focus on that main goal".

Critical reception

True 2 Myself received generally positive reviews from critics. At Album of the Year, which assigns a normalized rating out of 100 to reviews from professional publications, the album received an average score of 74, based on two reviews.

Alphonse Pierre of Pitchfork rated the album 6.5/10, stating that the album "is a playlist of soon-to-be singles grouped under the industry-formality heading of an "album". In a positive review, M. T. Richards at Consequence of Sound complimented the production, emphasizing how the beats are "very pretty second fiddle, never crowding Tjay out but always making their presence felt".

Commercial performance
True 2 Myself debuted at number five on the US Billboard 200 chart, earning 45,000 album-equivalent units (including 1,000 copies in pure album sales) in its first week. This became Lil Tjay's first US top-ten debut on the chart. In its second week, the album dropped to number eight on the chart, earning an additional 31,000 units. On February 21, 2023, the album was certified double platinum by the Recording Industry Association of America (RIAA) for combined sales and album-equivalent units of over two million units in the United States.

Track listing
Track listing and credits adapted from Apple Music and Tidal.

Charts

Weekly charts

Year-end charts

Certifications

References

2019 debut albums
Lil Tjay albums
Columbia Records albums